GTI Club+: Rally Côte d'Azur is the PlayStation 3 racing game by Konami. The arcade version itself is a remake of the original GTI Club released in 1996.

GTI Club+ was ported in HD by Sumo Digital, a Foundation 9 Entertainment affiliate, and was released through the European PlayStation Store on 4 December 2008, and the North American Store on 15 January 2009, and the Japan Store on 25 February 2010. As of 2012, it is no longer available for purchase due to license expiration.

Production
A first trailer was unveiled at the Leipzig Game Convention 2008. The video was followed by a playable demo on 27 November.

This enhanced version is rendered in 720p and runs at 60fps. It supports Dolby Digital 5.1 surround sound and the original BGM has been remixed by Atjazz.

Features
Compared with the arcade version, GTI Club+ adds a solo mode, an eight-player online multiplayer mode (Race and Time Bomb modes) instead of four-player, an online rankings leaderboard and is compatible with the PlayStation Eye which allows players to see themselves during playtime. Voice chat is also possible through the PlayStation Eye or Bluetooth headset. It also supports motion sensor steering through Sixaxis, rumble through DualShock 3 and PlayStation Network Trophies feature.

Cars & tracks

The arcade version contains four circuits: France, England, Italy and USA. This home version has only one out of the box, France, hence the title. The GTI Club+ official website claimed some new circuits to be available during 2009.

The Rally Côte d'Azur (a.k.a. France Course) consists in fictitious urban and harbour areas located in the Côte d'azur, also known as French Riviera. Road signs clearly hint at Monaco's Monte Carlo (Musée océanographique, parking Louis II, parking Square Gastaud) with references to nearby French cities of Menton (Port Garavan), Antibes, Digne and Nice.

Solo mode consists of four circuits named Easy, Medium, Hard and Free Run. Easy is a 3-lap course within a small area. Medium adds traffic and new sections to the Easy course. Hard is a 5-lap reverse version of the Medium course. Free Run is a traffic-free Time Attack version of Medium course.

Playable vehicles are the original 1996 GTI Club's four licensed European superminis from the '80s, namely the Morris Mini Cooper 1275S (Mk1), Renault 5 Alpine Turbo (A5/R122B), Volkswagen Golf GTi (Mk1), Autobianchi A112 Abarth plus the Lancia Delta HF 4WD. All of which are taken from the Supermini Festa! version.

A car customisation feature allows painting, horn selection as well as the use of stickers and decals. Alternative car versions are unlockable by winning races. Easy difficulty unlocks a Police colour scheme for the car the race was won in and said scheme is reminiscent of the livery of the police force of the country the car was made in (i.e. "Police", "Polizia" or "Polizei", though the Renault has a "Polizia" livery instead of the French "Police" for some reasons). Medium difficulty unlocks Taxi schemes for the cars. These Police and Taxi versions cannot be customized though.

An hidden vehicle called Toy Dog is unlocked when beating the Hard difficulty. This extra racer consists of a German Shepherd Dog-shaped wooden rocking dog.

Downloadable content

The first set of DLC entitled 'Car Pack 1' was released on 4 June 2009, adding four cars taken from GTI Club Supermini Festa!. These are the Fiat 500 Abarth, BMW Mini Cooper S (MkII), Peugeot 207 GTi (with a Supermini Festa! sticker) and Volkswagen Polo GTI (Mk5) with their respective Police and Taxi versions as in the arcade game. This first DLC also features a set of ten PSN Trophies.

Additional cars should be available as hinted by the empty car slots found in GTI Club+ 's Garage. These cars are likely to be the remaining three from the arcade version, i.e. Volkswagen Golf GTI 16v (Mk2), Fiat 500 Abarth 695SS and Nissan Micra (K12C).

References

External links
Official website (Arcade game)

2008 video games
Konami games
PlayStation 3 games
PlayStation 3-only games
PlayStation Network games
Racing video games
Video game remakes
Video games developed in the United Kingdom
Multiplayer and single-player video games
Sumo Digital games